| studio         = 
| distributor    = GMA Pictures
| released       = 
| runtime        = 110 minutes
| country        = Philippines
| language       = 
| budget         = 
| gross          = 
}}

Boy Pick-Up: The Movie is a 2012 Filipino comedy film starring Ogie Alcasid, Solenn Heussaff, and Dennis Trillo. The film was directed by Dominic Zapata and released by GMA Pictures & Regal Entertainment.

Boy Pick-Up: The Movie is the film adaptation of Bubble Gang's then latest famous skit "Pick-Up Lines Battle" featuring the fliptop-inspired battle of words using cheesy pick-up lines rather than well-rhyming trash talks. The film portrays the story of Boy Pick-Up (played by Ogie Alcasid) and Boy Back-Up (Eri Neeman) outside the Pick-Up Lines Battle Arena.

Synopsis
There is an underground battle going on in the name of love. The soldiers are all Pikapistas! With pickup lines as their weapons to woo the gorgeous Neneng B (Sam Pinto), the war sizzles in the dark corners of the metro. And there is one undefeated champion among them: Boy Pick-up (Ogie Alcasid)! Legendary, enigmatic, hypnotic, that’s his appeal to most who don’t get what his lines are all about, but his words penetrate their hearts just the same.
 
Despite his underground fame and legend, Boy Pick-up lives a normal and solitary life. When his landlady asks Boy to love her in exchange for several months of rent due, Boy is forced to look for a new job.
 
Boy applies as a pastry chef in Heaven’s Bakeshop, a bakery owned by Angel (Solenn Heussaff). In the brink of bankruptcy, Boy saves the bakeshop when he creates a pastry delight called “fishcake”. Angel feels indebted to Boy while Boy starts to fall for Angel.
 
Unknown to Boy, a dark force in the name of Bagwis (Dennis Trillo) is operating to destroy him, his love life and defeat him in the Pikapista battles. Bagwis wants to exact revenge on Boy Pick-up after losing the love of his life to him. Bagwis succeeds in defeating him one night during a pickup battle showdown, humiliating Boy in front of Angel.
 
The defeat takes its toll on Boy, his love life and his confidence. He realizes he needs to rise and rise above his situation so he can redeem himself. How will Boy emerge from the darkness? Who will help him succeed in the end, and how will he regain the Pikapista championship crown? Now, only one question remains: "Bakit?"

Cast

Main cast
Boy Pick-Up (Ogie Alcasid)
The legendary champion of the pikapista underground battles; lives a solitary life with his pet goldfish. Ironically, his love life is zero but he soon meets the love of his life when he applies as a pastry chef and sees Angel. And in this film is the end of Boy Pick-Up's undefeated streak after losing to Bagwis.

Angel (Solenn Heussaff)
Owner of Heaven’s Bakeshop, invests all her money to manage the bakeshop only to find out she’s going to be dumped by the man she loves and worse, leave her almost bankrupt.

Gabbs/Bagwis (Dennis Trillo)
A pikapista who is set to marry the love of his life; but the woman leaves him at the altar on the day of their wedding because of something Boy said. Gabbs attempts to kill himself but is rescued by a mysterious man who transforms him into Bagwis and uses him as the ultimate villain to destroy Boy Pick-up.

Supporting cast
Queen (Sarah Lahbati)
The woman Gabbs is supposed to marry but had a change of heart on the day of her wedding because of something she heard from Boy during a pikapista battle. All she wants is to get to know Gabbs better before she commits to him.
Neneng B. (Sam Pinto)
The beautiful woman at the center of the Pikapista battles.
Boy Back-up (Eri Neeman)
Boy Pickup’s crew in the pikapista battles, someone who seems to get Boy’s Pick-up line.
MC Bits (Michael V.)
The emcee of the pikapista battles
Sharona (Diego Llorico)
Boy’s landlord who is eternally seducing him. He threatens Boy with an eviction if the latter does to succumb to his charms.
Bogart (Betong Sumaya)
Angel’s loyal help at Heaven’s Bakeshop
Mayumi (Maey Bautista)
Angel’s loyal assistant at Heaven’s Bakeshop
Lilia (Lilia Cuntapay)
Boy’s mother who died when he was young.			
Master (Pepe Smith)
Boy Pickup’s friend and master who helps him get back to his feet after his defeat.
Boy Basag (Ogie Alcasid)
Boy Pickup's challenger who appeared near the end of the movie, taunting Boy Pick-Up and challenging him on a battle. He eventually became a regular character in the Pick Up Lines sketch in Bubble Gang. During the movie, he disguises himself by wearing diving materials and even parodying Obito Uchiha's mask and costume.

Extended cast
Gwen Zamora as Bombshell 1
Ellen Adarna as Bombshell 2
Jackie Rice
Boy 2 Quizon as Pushback		
Antonio Aquitania as Dahon
James Ronald Moymoy Obeso as Sukli
Rodfil Roadfill Obeso as Bagoong
Kerbie Zamora as Bagwis Crew
Knowa Lazarus of Q-York as Bagwis Crew
Flava Matikz of Q-York as Bagwis Crew
Jerome B Smooth as Bagwis Crew
Victor Aliwalas
Aaron Novilla as Young Boy Pick-Up

Cameo roles
Derek Ramsay as bus conductor
Gina Alajar as nun
Luis Alandy as cigarette vendor
Boy Abunda
Vicki Belo
Ian Batherson
Kristofer Martin
Joyce Ching as grocery cashier
Bong Revilla as Panday (pick-up battle contestant)
Dingdong Dantes
Joey Reyes
Tim Yap
Boy Logro as Boy Tokwa (pick-up battle contestant)
Gloc-9 as narrator
Isko Salvador, Cesar Cosme and Chito Francisco as Ang Dating Doon hosts Brod Pete, Brother Willy and Brother Jocel
Abra
Loonie Peroramas
Apekz
Dello
Mike Swift

Production
Boy Pick-Up: The Movie is a film adaptation of the Boy Pick-Up skits of the television show Bubble Gang. The film was made in response to positive reception by Bubble Gang fans of the show, who are also the primary target audience of the film along with those who are fans of pick-up lines.

The skit was expanded to include a back story to the eponymous character of the Boy Pick-Up skits such as details about his neighbors, daily life, romantic life, and his parents. The character of boy pick up was a concept of the production team of Bubble Gang.

Bakit Tinawag na Neneng Bakit si Neneng Bakit?
In the 17th anniversary of Bubble Gang one skit or episode includes this one which explains how Neneng B came to be and it literally means How did Neneng Bakit got called Neneng Bakit?

Synopsis
In a squatters area in Manila, a young Neneng (Barbara Miguel) received expired chocolate from somebody and her grandmother (Tya Pusit) said that she should always ask before getting something, explaining why Neneng always says "Bakit?" or "Why?", after the incident her neighbor told her that her grandmother died when 5 tires accidentally fell on her. A few years later, Neneng (now Sam Pinto) now a waitress was being harassed by some customers and Boy Pick Up saw her and he saved her and coincidentally he was searching for the right Pick Up Girl so when he heard Neneng say Bakit? he knew that she was the right one and that is the reason why Neneng B. came to be.

Soundtrack

Track listing

References

External links

2012 films
2010s Tagalog-language films
2010s English-language films
Regal Entertainment films
GMA Pictures films
2012 multilingual films
Philippine multilingual films